The Russian Second League, formerly Russian Professional Football League is the third level of Russian professional football.

History
In 1998–2010, it was run by the Professional Football League. The 2011–12 season was run by the Department of Professional Football of the Russian Football Union. From 2013 to 2021 season the league was again run by the Professional Football League and the name Second Division was no longer used, the league was just called PFL. Before the 2021–22 season, the league was merged organizationally with the second-tier First League and renamed to FNL2. Before the 2022–23 season, its short name was changed again, to a historical name "Russian Second League", even though the league's full title ("Second Division of the Football National League") remained the same.

The Second League is geographically divided into 4 zones: 1 (ex-South - Southern European Russia), 2 (ex-West - Western European Russia and Eastern Siberia), 3 (ex-Centre - Northern and Eastern European Russia and Sakhalin), 4 (ex-Ural-Povolzhye - Southern Urals and Western Siberia). The number of clubs in each zone varies between years. In the 2020–21 season, there were 64 clubs in the division. 

The winners of each zone are automatically promoted to the Russian First League (known before 2011 as the First Division and from 2011 to 2022 as Russian Football National League). The bottom finishers of each zone lose professional status and are relegated to the Russian Amateur Football League. The teams typically can avoid relegation as long as they still have necessary financing to stay in the FNL2. Each club plays its opponents twice home and away.

Winners

References

External links
  Professional Football League official website
  Department of professional football of the Russian Football Union
 Russian Professional Football League summary(SOCCERWAY)

 
3
Rus
Professional sports leagues in Russia